Sorbus wallichii is a species of plant in the family Rosaceae. It is found in China, India, and Nepal.

References

wallichii
Least concern plants
Trees of Nepal
Flora of East Himalaya
Flora of Assam (region)
Trees of China
Taxonomy articles created by Polbot